St George and St Ethelbert's Church, East Ham, is a Church of England church in East Ham, east London.

St Mary Magdalene's Church, East Ham built a temporary mission hall known as St George's on the corner of Boston Road and Masterman Road by 1914, on a site bought on the Greatfield Estate around 1912. It became a parish of its own in 1923, though it took until 1936-1937 for a permanent church to be built, with more than 50% of the funding provided by the Diocese of Hereford, which requested the addition of St Ethelbert to the dedication - he is one of the two dedicatees of Hereford Cathedral, the other being the Virgin Mary.

References

Church of England church buildings in East Ham
1914 establishments in England
1937 establishments in England
20th-century Church of England church buildings
Conservative evangelical Anglican churches in England